Mark Ferguson (born 28 February 1961) is a New Zealand-based Australian actor and television presenter.

Biography
Born in Sydney, Australia, Ferguson attended the National Institute of Dramatic Art (NIDA) and graduated in 1981.  In 1982, he played Paul Shepard in the television series Sons and Daughters, played alongside Michael York in the film The Far Country and starred in The Sinking of the Rainbow Warrior.  Between 1992 and 1995, he portrayed twin brothers Darryl and Damian Neilson in the popular New Zealand soap opera Shortland Street and had a stint in the award-winning animation short film "When Ponds Freeze Over".

In 1994, he made his first appearance in Hercules – The Legendary Journeys, playing Prometheus in "Hercules and the Circle of Fire". He also had roles in the Xena television series.

Ferguson had a role in Peter Jackson's The Lord of the Rings: The Fellowship of the Ring, in which he portrayed Gil-galad, the last High King of the Noldor. Though most of his scenes were eventually cut from the movie, he can still be spotted at several shots during the film's prologue.

In 2001, Ferguson was the New Zealand host of Australian reality television series Big Brother Australia and The Mole, as well as several special episodes of Big Brother Australia 2001 and 2002.  Also in 2001 Ferguson played Andrew Couch in the television series Spin Doctors.

In 2012, he appeared as Dominus in an episode of Spartacus: War of the Damned.

Filmography

 Sons and Daughters (1982) (TV Series) – Paul Sheppard
 A Country Practice (1982) (TV Series) –  Phil Shepherd
 The Far Country (1986) (TV) – Harry Peters
 Gloss (1987) (TV)
 The Rainbow Warrior (1992) – Det. Neil Morris
 The Further Adventures of Black Beauty – (1992) (TV Series) Masters
 Shortland Street (1992–1995) (TV series) – Darryl Neilson
 Marlin Bay (1992) (TV Series) – Gene Toomey
 Hercules in the Underworld (1994) – Hades
 Hercules: The Legendary Journeys Hercules and the Circle of Fire (1994) (TV) – Prometheus
 High Tide (1994) (TV series) – Robert E. Harper
 Hercules: The Legendary Journeys – As Darkness Falls (1994) (TV Episode) – Craesus the Centaur
 Xena: Warrior Princess – Hooves and Harlots (1995) (TV Episode) – Krykus
 Melody Rules (1995) (Sitcom) – Aaron
 Xena: Warrior Princess – Orphan of War (1996) (TV Episode) – Dagnine
 Xena: Warrior Princess – Remember Nothing (1996) (TV Episode) – Krykus
 Every Woman's Dream (1996) (TV movie) – Bank Officer
 Xena: Warrior Princess – The Xena Scrolls (1996) (TV Episode) – John Smythe
 Shortland Street (1998) (TV Series) – Damian Neilson
 Xena: Warrior Princess – Past Imperfect (1999) (TV Episode) – Dagnine
 Above the Law – Happy Families (2000) (TV Episode) – Andie
 Big Brother Australia (2001) – Himself
 The Mole (TV Series) (2001) – Himself
 Big Brother Australia 2002 (2001) – Himself
 Spin Doctors (2001–2003) (TV Series) – Andrew Couch
 The Lord of the Rings: The Fellowship of the Ring (2001) – Gil-galad
 Spooked (2004) – Bill Roberts
 Living the Dream (2004) (TV Series) – The Smarmy Host
 Power Rangers Mystic Force – (2006) (voice) – Gekkor
 Power Rangers Operation Overdrive – (2007) (voice) – Moltor
 Spartacus: War of the Damned - (2012) - Dominus

References

External links

 
 Mark Ferguson Fan Website
 Mark Ferguson at Auckland Actors
 NY Times movie person database

1961 births
Australian male film actors
National Institute of Dramatic Art alumni
Australian people of Scottish descent
Australian male voice actors
Big Brother (Australian TV series)
Living people